St. John's Medical College is a private medical college and hospital situated in Bangalore, India. It is part of the St. John's National Academy of Health Sciences run by the Catholic Bishops' Conference of India. It was established in 1963. The college annually accepts 150 students for the MBBS undergraduate course based on a national entrance exam. It also accepts 100 postgraduate students (80 MD & 20 Diploma) to a number of medical specialties. The college culfest Autumn Muse is one of the oldest and largest in South India.

Partnerships 
In 2018, St. John's Medical College partnered with Apple to conduct a needs assessment of the health and well-being of supplier employees. Based on assessment findings, Apple developed and launched a training curriculum to improve health knowledge in key areas. St. John's also provided nutrition consultation that has led to improvements at several supplier cafeterias.

Undergraduate courses 
The college offers the four and a half year M.B.B.S. course with a one-year compulsory rotating internship. There are 150 seats which are filled through NEET exam.

Academic divisions
In December 1994, the Institution was renamed as St. John's National Academy of Health Sciences and it comprises the following Institutes:

 St. John's Medical College
 St. John's Medical College Hospital
 St. John's Research Institute
 St. John's College of Nursing
 St. John's Institute of Health Management and Para Medical Studies

Rankings

St John's Medical College was ranked 14th among medical colleges in India by the National Institutional Ranking Framework in 2020. St. John's Medical College was ranked 17th among medical colleges in India in 2020 by India Today.

References

External links
 

Medical colleges in Karnataka
Catholic universities and colleges in India
Colleges in Bangalore
1965 establishments in Mysore State
Educational institutions established in 1965